Tetraschalis ochrias is a moth of the family Pterophoridae. It is found in India.

References

Moths described in 1908
Pterophorinae
Moths of Asia
Taxa named by Edward Meyrick